Royner C. Greene (May 2, 1905 – February 4, 1979) was a college men's basketball and baseball coach. He was the head coach of Cornell from 1946 to 1959. He coached Cornell to a 165–143 record, winning one Eastern Intercollegiate Basketball League championship and one NCAA tournament appearance.  He also served as a high school coach prior to and after his time at Cornell.

Head coaching record

Basketball

References

1905 births
1979 deaths
American men's basketball coaches
Cornell Big Red baseball coaches
Cornell Big Red men's basketball coaches
High school basketball coaches in the United States
Illinois Fighting Illini men's basketball players
North Park Vikings baseball coaches
North Park Vikings men's basketball coaches
Place of birth missing
American men's basketball players